György Kőszegi (12 September 1950 – 12 December 2001) was a Hungarian weightlifter who competed in the 1976 Summer Olympics and in the 1980 Summer Olympics. He was born in Nyíregyháza.
At the 1976 Olympic Games, he won the silver medal.

References

1950 births
2001 deaths
Hungarian male weightlifters
Olympic weightlifters of Hungary
Weightlifters at the 1976 Summer Olympics
Weightlifters at the 1980 Summer Olympics
Olympic silver medalists for Hungary
Olympic medalists in weightlifting
People from Nyíregyháza
Medalists at the 1976 Summer Olympics
Sportspeople from Szabolcs-Szatmár-Bereg County
20th-century Hungarian people